Arc Voltaic (in English: Electric Arc) was a Catalan poetry magazine published in the city of Barcelona.

Only one number of this magazine was published in February 1918. It was directed by Joan Salvat-Papasseit. The cover contains a drawing by the painter Joan Miró. Its authorization for the publication was done by Josep M. de Sucre. It was printed by “Art”, a company situated in Provenza Street in the city of Barcelona. The magazine cost forty five cents and it consisted in 8 pages in a format of 195-135mm. The poems are written in Catalan, Spanish and French.

Theme and collaborators 
This magazine had a subtitle which showed that its theme was the emotive poetry of avant-garde movement. The number consisted in only 8 pages and contained poems from Salvat-Papasseit, its director, and other authors like Emili Eroles, Joaquim Folguera, J. Torres Garcia and Antoni d’Ignacios. Moreover, it contained drawings from Joan Miró and Rafael Barradas. Arc Voltaic was very important in the diffusion of the avant-garde movement called Vibracionisme promoted by Rafael Barradas.

References

External links
 Digitalization available in the ARCA Portal (archive of antique Catalan magazines)

1918 establishments in Spain
1918 disestablishments in Spain
Catalan-language magazines
Defunct literary magazines published in Europe
Defunct magazines published in Spain
Literary magazines published in Spain
Magazines established in 1918
Magazines disestablished in 1918
Magazines published in Barcelona
Poetry literary magazines